Hania Moro (born 1 October 1996) is an Egyptian swimmer. She competed in the women's 400 metre freestyle event at the 2017 World Aquatics Championships. In 2019, she represented Egypt at the 2019 African Games held in Rabat, Morocco.

References

External links
 

1996 births
Living people
Egyptian female swimmers
Place of birth missing (living people)
Swimmers at the 2019 African Games
African Games gold medalists for Egypt
African Games silver medalists for Egypt
African Games medalists in swimming
Swimmers at the 2013 Mediterranean Games
Egyptian female freestyle swimmers
Mediterranean Games competitors for Egypt
20th-century Egyptian women
21st-century Egyptian women